What Wives Want is a 1923 American silent drama film directed by Jack Conway and starring Ethel Grey Terry, Vernon Steele and Niles Welch.

Cast
 Ethel Grey Terry as Claire Howard 
 Vernon Steele as Austin Howard 
 Ramsey Wallace as John Reeves 
 Niles Welch as David Loring
 Margaret Landis as Alice Loring 
 Lila Leslie as Mrs. Van Dusen 
 Henry A. Barrows as Newhart

References

Bibliography
 James Robert Parish & Michael R. Pitts. Film directors: a guide to their American films. Scarecrow Press, 1974.

External links
 

1923 films
1923 drama films
1920s English-language films
American silent feature films
Silent American drama films
Films directed by Jack Conway
American black-and-white films
Universal Pictures films
1920s American films